Aída León de Rodríguez, born Aída Judith León Lara (born June 23, 1928), was the First Lady of Ecuador to Guillermo Rodríguez, her husband.

Biography
León was born in Pujilí, Cotopaxi Province to Pujileños José Gabriel León Jácome and Matilde Victoria Lara Rubio. In 1953, she married General Guillermo Rodríguez and had five children.

As First Lady of Ecuador, León was president of the National Children's Trust (INNFA since 1980). She focused on institutionalizing it, giving it legal status and drawing up a complete inventory of assets it owned created by Corina del Parral in 1960. In this capacity, she enjoyed the support of the Comptroller General.

Early in 1973, León was in charge of the evacuation and treatment of victims of a flood in Babahoyo, where she suffered sepsis that required treatment at the Walter Reed National Military Medical Center in Washington D.C.

Citations

First ladies of Ecuador
Living people
1928 births
People from Pujilí
21st-century Ecuadorian women politicians
21st-century Ecuadorian politicians